41st New York Film Critics Circle Awards
January 25, 1976
(announced December 30, 1975)

Best Picture: 
 Nashville 
The 41st New York Film Critics Circle Awards, January 25, 1976, honored the best filmmaking of 1975.

Winners
Best Actor:
Jack Nicholson - One Flew Over the Cuckoo's Nest
Runner-up: Al Pacino - Dog Day Afternoon
Best Actress: 
Isabelle Adjani - The Story of Adele H. (L'histoire d'Adèle H.)
Runner-up: Florinda Bolkan - A Brief Vacation (Una breve vacanza)
Best Director: 
Robert Altman - Nashville
Runner-up: Stanley Kubrick - Barry Lyndon
Best Film: 
Nashville
Runner-up: Barry Lyndon
Best Screenplay: 
François Truffaut, Jean Gruault and Suzanne Schiffman - The Story of Adele H. (L'histoire d'Adèle H.)
Runner-up: Lina Wertmüller - Swept Away (Travolti da un insolito destino nell'azzurro mare d'agosto)
Best Supporting Actor: 
Alan Arkin - Hearts of the West
Runner-up: Henry Gibson - Nashville
Best Supporting Actress: 
Lily Tomlin - Nashville
Runner-up: Louise Fletcher - One Flew Over the Cuckoo's Nest

References

External links
1975 Awards

1975
New York Film Critics Circle Awards, 1975
New York Film Critics Circle Awards
New York Film Critics Circle Awards
New York Film Critics Circle Awards
New York Film Critics Circle Awards